The Saxon Fairy Swallow is a breed of fancy pigeon developed over many years of selective breeding. Saxon Fairy Swallows, along with other varieties of domesticated pigeons, are all descendants from the rock pigeon (Columba livia). The Saxon Swallows and Wing Pigeons have various markings and patterns (spot marking, cap marking etc.).

Saxon Fairy Swallow pigeons are well known for the odd feathered feet.

See also 
List of pigeon breeds

References

Pigeon breeds